The Jobar sarin attack took place on 24 August 2013 around 11:00 in Jobar, a suburb of the Syrian capital city Damascus.

Background
Jobar is a suburb of Syria's capital city Damascus.

Attack
On 24 August 2013, a group of Syrian Army soldiers were clearing buildings from opposition forces in Jobar. Around 11:00, the intensity of the shooting from the opposition side subsided and the soldiers believed the rebels were retreating. Then, an improvised explosive device detonated with a low noise about 10 meters from them. The IED reportedly released "a very badly smelling gas".

10 soldiers were injured and evacuated to the nearest medical point where they were treated with intravenous fluids and oxygen before being sent to Martyr Yusuf Al Azmah Military Hospital for further treatment. Four of them were severely affected. Another 20 soldiers came later with similar symptoms, but they were in stable condition and could, after some time, be sent back to their units. All patients received "atropine, HI-6, steroids, oxygen therapy and fluids treatment."

Aftermath
The UN mission received soil samples from the impact site and remnants of two IEDs allegedly used to disperse the chemical agent. The soil samples tested positive for sarin. However, the UN mission "could not verify the chain of custody for this sampling and subsequent analysis". On 30 August 2013, the UN mission visited the affected soldiers at a military hospital.

See also 
 Khan al-Assal chemical attack
 Jobar chemical attacks
 Ghouta chemical attack
 Ashrafiyat Sahnaya chemical attack

References

Chemical weapons attacks
Military operations of the Syrian civil war involving chemical weapons